Upper Urashi Forest Reserve is a nature reserve in Rivers State, Nigeria located on the upper reaches of the Urashi River, near the village of Ikodi in Ahoada West. The reserve covers an area of 25,165 ha (97.163 sq mi). It was designated a wetland of international importance under the Ramsar Convention on 30 April 2008.

Climate
The climate of Upper Urashi is Tropical monsoon climate (Köppen climate classification "Am"), characterized by a lengthy wet season from March to November and a short dry season from December to February. The average annual precipitation is 2510 millimetres (99 in), with the month of September being typically the wettest month of the year. The forest stays inundated from September to November by floodwaters of Urashi River, resulting in siltification and soil fertility augmentation.

Flora
Originally established on 30 December 1899 with 9,696 ha (37.44 sq mi), it includes a variety of habitat types such as tropical lowland rainforest, moorland, marshes and seasonal lakes. Among the tree species recorded in the reserve, are the Lophira alata, Ricinodendron heudelotii, Albizia adianthifolia and Hexalobus crispiflorus. The Hallea ledermannii, which is important for the forestry industry, is present in this forest, but has dropped significantly as a result of its extensive use. The oil palm trees (Elaeis guineensis) and Musanga cecropioides are also found in the higher areas.

Fauna
The reserve is a minor centre of endemism for sclater's guenon and endangered white-throated guenon, red colobus monkey and Heslop's pygmy hippopotamus. It also provides a major roosting site for the grey parrot (Psittacus erithacas) and hosts a number of waterbird species whose distribution is confined to the Guinea-Congo Forests biome.

Conservation
The Upper Orashi Forest Reserve is administered by the Forestry Department of the Rivers State Ministry of Agriculture. It is classed as IUCN protected area category VI (protected area with sustainable use of natural resources) with the objective of sustainable multiple use of forest resources and scientific research, with emphasis on methods for sustainable exploitation of native forests.

References 

Forests of Rivers State
Protected areas established in 1899
Ramsar sites in Nigeria
1899 establishments in the British Empire
Important Bird Areas of Nigeria
Forest Reserves of Nigeria